The Omaha and South Western Railroad was a subsidiary of the Chicago, Burlington and Quincy Railroad, carrying the CB&Q from the west to Omaha, Nebraska starting in the 1860s.

The railroad line is still in operation by the BNSF Railway, successor to the CB&Q; Amtrak trains also operate over the line.

The town of La Platte in Sarpy County was laid out by the Omaha and Southwestern Railroad in 1870, and was named for the surrounding Platte River valley.

References

Defunct Nebraska railroads
Predecessors of the Chicago, Burlington and Quincy Railroad
Railway companies established in 1869
Railway companies disestablished in 1908
1869 establishments in Nebraska
American companies established in 1869
American companies disestablished in 1908